Pchelovodstvo is a venerable and well regarded Russian journal dealing with Beekeeping. The journal promotes the newest methods of beekeeping and targets a broad audience. The first issue was published in 1921 and continues today, published 10 times a year. The headquarters is in Moscow. Its chief editor is O. A. Vereshchaka. The editorial board is made up of Academician of the RAS A. M. Smirnov, Hon. Prof. Dr. V. N. Krylov, Prof. Dr. h. c. V. I. Lebedev et al. The journal is included in the list of both leading scientific journals and publications under review of VAK (Higher Attestation Commission). Pchelovodstvo is also included in Russian index of scientific quoting Russian Science Citation Index.

ISSN 0369-8629

External links
 Official website

Magazines established in 1921
Business magazines published in Russia
Russian-language magazines
Magazines published in the Soviet Union
Magazines published in Moscow
Ten times annually magazines